The Tunisian A' national basketball team, nicknamed Les Aigles de Carthage (The Eagles of Carthage or The Carthage Eagles), is the national basketball team of Tunisia.

The team is governed by the Tunisia Basketball Federation (FTBB).

History

Competitive record

AfroCan
 Champions   Runners-up   Third place   Fourth place

Red border color indicates tournament was held on home soil.

Team

Current roster
This is the 2018-2019 roster.

|}
| valign="top" |
Head coach

Assistant coaches

Legend
Club – describes lastclub before the tournament
Age – describes ageon 20 August 2015
|}

See also
Tunisia national basketball team
Tunisia women's national basketball team
Tunisia men's national under-20 basketball team
Tunisia national under-19 basketball team
Tunisia national under-17 basketball team
Tunisia women's national under-20 basketball team
Tunisia women's national under-19 basketball team
Tunisia women's national under-17 basketball team
Tunisia national 3x3 team
Tunisia women's national 3x3 team
Tunisia Basketball Federation

References

External links
Official website
FIBA profile
Tunisia Basketball Records at FIBA Archive
Afrobasket – Tunisia Men National Team

National basketball teams
Basketball in Tunisia
Men
Basketball
1956 establishments in Tunisia